Selwyn United Football Club is an amateur football club based in the Selwyn region of New Zealand. Formed in 2013 following the merger of Ellesmere FC and Rolleston FC, they currently compete in the Southern League, one of three qualifying leagues for the New Zealand National League.

The club also competes in the Chatham Cup, New Zealand's premier knockout tournaments for men. The best Selwyn United have done in the competition is make it to the third round, which they have done three times in 2016 and 2018 and 2021 before losing to local rivals Cashmere Technical each time.

Former players

  Pieter-Taco Bierema

References

External links
Official website
Facebook
Soccerway profile

Association football clubs in Christchurch
2013 establishments in New Zealand
Association football clubs established in 2013